A scale test car is a type of railroad car in maintenance of way service.  Its purpose is to calibrate the weighing scales used to weigh loaded railroad cars.  Scale test cars are of a precisely known weight so that the track scale can be calibrated against them.

Purposes
Cars are weighed for various purposes. These include:

Axle load limits
Cars are weighed to ensure they are within the axle load limits of the railroad.

Customer billing
Cars are weighed to determine (by subtracting the car's unloaded, or tare weight from the total weight) the amount of cargo loaded.  This is used to bill the railroad's customers for the carriage of bulk commodities, so it is essential that the track scales be accurate.

Construction
Many scale test cars were small, old railroad cars carrying heavy metal weights as their superstructure.  Scale test cars needed special handling so they would not suffer damage, which might alter their weight.  They were reweighed periodically on accurate scales at the railroad's shops.

See also 
 Rail weighbridge

References

Bibliography 
AAR, Engineering Division, "AAR Scale Handbook (2011)"
USDA, AMS, Grain Inspection Packers and Stockyards Administration(GIPSA), "Weighing Handbook" Chap. 3, Pages 31 thru 34, 27DEC2010 (Overall Document dated: Apr 2014) Retrieved: 08JUN2020

External links
NIST circa 1913 scale test car and its transporter rail car. One of its large calibration masses can be seen being hoisted onto the scale test car.

Maintenance of way equipment
Mass
Measuring instruments